Maidi is a village in Dhading District in the Bagmati Zone of central Nepal. At the time of the 1991 Nepal census it had a population of 8496 and had 1627 houses in it.

Formerly, Maidi was a village development committee (VDC), which were local-level administrative units. In 2017, the government of Nepal restructured local government in line with the 2015 constitution and VDCs were discontinued.

References

Populated places in Dhading District